Barfod is a surname. Notable people with the surname include:

Hakon Barfod (1926–2013), Norwegian sailor
Line Barfod (born 1964), Danish lawyer and politician
Tomas Barfod, Danish drummer

See also
Ludvig Birkedal-Barfod (1850–1937), Danish classical organist and composer
Barfod v. Denmark

Danish-language surnames